Dryja is a surname. Notable people with the surname include:

 Dawid Dryja (born 1992), volleyball player
 Thaddeus Dryja, American ophthalmologist and geneticist

See also
 Dryja, Greater Poland Voivodeship, village in west-central Poland
 Dryja coat of arms

Polish-language surnames